Graham Fletcher (born 9 January 1951) is a British equestrian. He competed in two events at the 1976 Summer Olympics.

References

1951 births
Living people
British male equestrians
Olympic equestrians of Great Britain
Equestrians at the 1976 Summer Olympics
People from Thirsk